The Vayenga is a river in Vinogradovsky District of Arkhangelsk Oblast in Russia. It is a right tributary of the Northern Dvina. The area of its basin . Its main tributaries are the Yugna (right) and the Nondrus (left).

The river basin of the Vayenga occupies the whole northern and central parts of Vinogradovsky District and minor parts of adjacent Kholmogorsky and Pinezhsky Districts.

The source of the Vayenga is in the center of the district, north-east of the village of Nyavody. It flows initially to the west, then turns north, and after accepting the Kisema from the right, turns north-west. After accepting from the north a right tributary, the Yugna, the Vayenga turns south-west, and eventually south and south-east. The first village in the course of the Vayenga is Vorontsy, upstream from Vorontsy the valley is not populated. South of Vorontsy the Vayenga makes a loop, accepts the Nondrus from  the left, and eventually turns 180 degrees and flows north-west. Below the village of Nizhnyaya Vayenga the river turns east.

Until the 1990s, the Vayenga was used for timber rafting.

References

External links 
 

Rivers of Arkhangelsk Oblast